The 4 arrondissements of the Eure-et-Loir department are:
 Arrondissement of Chartres, (prefecture of the Eure-et-Loir department: Chartres) with 148 communes. The population of the arrondissement was 209,218 in 2016.  
 Arrondissement of Châteaudun, (subprefecture: Châteaudun) with 61 communes. The population of the arrondissement was 59,262 in 2016.  
 Arrondissement of Dreux, (subprefecture: Dreux) with 108 communes. The population of the arrondissement was 129,414 in 2016.  
 Arrondissement of Nogent-le-Rotrou, (subprefecture: Nogent-le-Rotrou) with 48 communes. The population of the arrondissement was 36,035 in 2016.

History

In 1800 the arrondissements of Chartres, Châteaudun, Dreux and Nogent-le-Rotrou were established. The arrondissement of Nogent-le-Rotrou was disbanded in 1926, and restored in 1943.

References

Eure-et-Loir